Muni Shri Sudhasagar Maharaj is a Digambar monk initiated by Acharya Vidyasagar.

Life

A part of Jain sangha of Sant Shiromani 108 Aacharya Shri Vidyasagar ji Maharaj, sudhasagar ji is a very knowledgeable saint in the clan of saints of Jainism. A very prominent guru, he works for the welfare of the Jain temples, Jains and the society.
He is the inspiration behind the renovation of many Jain temples which were in very bad condition decades ago. Examples of this are famous Jain temples of Rajasthan like Sanghiji located at Sanganer, Dadabari Kota etc. He is also the inspiration behind the magnificent Nareli Jain temple (Gyanodaya tirth kshetra). Sudhasagar took the initiative to get an ancient Jain temple of Tirthankara Shantinatha, situated in Bajranggarh, Madhya Pradesh, reconstructed.

Foundation stone for Jain temple in Banswara, Rajasthan was laid in his presence in April, 2016.

Sudhasagar visited Udaipur in June 2016.

See also

References

External links
 Official website

1958 births
Living people
Indian Jain monks 
21st-century Indian Jains 
21st-century Jain monks 
21st-century Indian monks
Digambara monks